James A. Lintz (born November 14, 1949) is an American former politician. He served in the South Dakota House of Representatives from 1999 to 2004 and in the Senate from 2005 to 2008.

References

1949 births
Living people
Politicians from Rapid City, South Dakota
Educators from South Dakota
Ranchers from South Dakota
Republican Party members of the South Dakota House of Representatives
Republican Party South Dakota state senators